Changareh (also Romanized as Chengoreh, Chongorah, Chongoreh, and Chongorreh; also known as Chahgāreh, Chahkareh, and Changareh Fa’leh Gari) is a village in Gavrud Rural District, in the Central District of Sonqor County, Kermanshah Province, Iran. At the 2006 census, its population was 110, in 21 families.

References 

Populated places in Sonqor County